Diasemopsis is a genus of stalk-eyed flies in the family Diopsidae. They are known from sub-Saharan Africa.

Species
D. aethiopica (Rondani, 1873)
D. albifacies Curran, 1931 (Central Africa)
D. amora Curran, 1931 (Zimbabwe)
D. apifasciata Brunetti, 1928 (Ghana)
D. comoroensis Carr & Foeldvari, 2006
D. concolor (Westwood, 1837) (Zimbabwe)
D. coniortodes (Speiser, 1910) (Tanzania)
D. conjuncta Curran, 1931 (Cameroon)
D. dejecta Curran, 1931 (Congo)
D. disconcerta Curran, 1931 (Liberia, Cameroon)
D. dubia (Bigot, 1874)
D. elegantula Brunetti, 1926 (Congo, South Africa)
D. elongata Curran, 1931 (Liberia, Cameroon, Congo) 
D. exquisita Brunetti, 1928 (Sierra Leone, Côte d'Ivoire, Congo)
D. fasciata (Gray, 1832)
D. fusca Lindner, 1954 (Tanzania)
D. fuscapicis Brunetti, 1928 (Cameroon, Gabon)
D. fuscivenis Brunetti, 1926 (Congo)
D. hirsuta Curran, 1931 (Congo)
D. hirta Lindner, 1954 (Tanzania)
D. horni Curran, 1931
D. jeanneli Séguy, 1938
D. jillyi Feijen, 1978 (Congo)
D. latifascia (Brunetti, 1928)
D. longipedunculata Brunetti, 1928
D. meigenii (Westwood, 1837) (Widespread Afrotropical Region)
D. minuta (Séguy, 1955) (Cameroun, Ivory Coast)
D. munroi Curran, 1931 (South Africa)
D. nebulosa Curran, 1931
D. obscura (Westwood, 1837) (Sierra Leone)
D. obstans (Walker, 1861) (South Africa)
D. pleuritica Curran, 1931 (Congo, Zambia)
D. pulchella Eggers, 1916 (Uganda, Cameroun)
D. quadrata Curran, 1931
D. robusta Brunetti, 1926 (Congo)
D. sexnotata Brunetti, 1928 (Gabon)
D. siderata Séguy, 1955 (Ivory Coast)
D. signata (Dalman, 1817) (Sierra Leone, Congo)
D. silvatica Eggers, 1916
D. subfuscata Brunetti, 1926 (Congo)
D. thaxteri Curran, 1931 (Cameroun)
D. thomyris (Séguy, 1955)
D. wolteri Lindner, 1954 (Tanzania, Congo)

References

Diopsidae
Diptera of Africa
Diopsoidea genera
Taxa named by Camillo Rondani